Codatractus is a Neotropical and Nearctic genus in the family Hesperiidae (Eudaminae).

Species
The following species are recognised in the genus Codatractus:
 Codatractus cyledis (Dyar, 1912) - Mexico
 Codatractus bryaxis (Hewitson, 1867) Mexico to Guatemala
 Codatractus imalena (Butler, 1872) –  Costa Rica to Colombia, Brazil (Amazonas).
 Codatractus arizonensis (Skinner, 1905) – Arizona skipper – southeast Arizona, New Mexico, west Texas, Mexico
 Codatractus sallyae Warren, 1995 – Mexico
 Codatractus melon (Godman & Salvin, [1893]) – Mexico, Guatemala, Nicaragua
 Codatractus carlos Evans, 1952
 Codatractus rowena Evans, 1952
 Codatractus alcaeus (Hewitson, 1867) – white-crescent longtail
 Codatractus apulia Evans, 1952
 Codatractus yucatanus Freeman, 1977 – Mexico
 Codatractus aminias (Hewitson, 1867) – Brazil, Paraguay, Argentina

References

Natural History Museum Lepidoptera genus database

External links
images representing Codatractus at Consortium for the Barcode of Life

Hesperiidae
Hesperiidae of South America
Taxa named by Arthur Ward Lindsey
Hesperiidae genera
Taxa described in 1921